Parazelota is a genus of moths of the family Yponomeutidae.

Species
Parazelota dryotoma - Meyrick, 1913 

Yponomeutidae